Alne is a village and civil parish in the Hambleton District of North Yorkshire, England, about twelve miles north-west of York and four miles from Easingwold.  The parish has a population of 711 (2001 census), increasing to 756 at the 2011 census.

Etymology
The village is named in the Domesday Book as part of the Bulford Hundred and owned by the church of St Peter, York. The name may be derived from the Latin word Alnus for Alder, as the village was surrounded by these trees. The name could also be derived from a river-name of the Alaunā type, derived from Brittonic al-, "bright, shining" (Welsh alaw, "waterlily"). This may have been an alternative name for the River Kyle.

History

The Parish used to include the nearby settlements of Tholthorpe, Aldwark, Flawith, Youlton and Tollerton, covering nearly 10,000 acres. To the north-east of the village used to be Alne Station opened in 1841, but was closed to passengers in 1958. Alne Hall in the Middle Ages was the country residence of the treasurers of St Peter's, York.

Governance

The village is within the Thirsk & Malton parliamentary constituency. It is within the Tollerton ward of Hambleton Local Government District and the Easingwold electoral district of North Yorkshire County Council. The civil parish is made up of four councillors.

Geography

The village used to have a railway station on the East Coast Main Line that runs less than a mile to the east of the village.

The soil contains some alluvium as well as sand and loam. The land to the east of the village is a good source of brick clay, and supports the York Handmade Brick Company who have supplied specialist bricks to The Shard and  railway station.

Village amenities

In the village there is Alne Cricket Club who play in the Nidderdale and District Amateur Cricket League. The local Tennis Club play in local leagues at the local Recreational Playing Fields. There is also a public house, the Blue Bell Inn, which was one of three inns in the village in the 1820s. The village is home to two Nursing and Care homes, Oak Trees and Leonard Cheshire.

The village also hosts an annual street fayre, which has been mentioned in The Times top 20 days out, that raises funds for the maintenance and improvement of the Alne recreation and sports park.

Demography

The 2001 census showed that the population of the parish was 711 in 249 households. Of those dwellings, 159 are detached and 215 owner occupied. Of the total population, 497 are aged 16 or over of which 316 were in employment.

In the 2011 census, the population was 756 in 272 dwellings.

Education

The village has one school, Alne County Primary School, for pupils aged 4 to 11. Pupils receive their secondary education at Easingwold School.

Religion

There is one church in the village, St Mary's, which is a Grade I listed building that has been extensively rebuilt from its original Norman structure. There used to be a Methodist Chapel as well built in 1848.

References

External links
 

Villages in North Yorkshire
Civil parishes in North Yorkshire